Blastobasis eridryas is a moth in the  family Blastobasidae. It is found in Ethiopia.

The length of the forewings is 8 mm. The forewings are pale brownish yellow intermixed with a few brownish red scales tipped with pale greyish yellow on the basal two-thirds. On the distal one-third consists of brownish red scales tipped with pale greyish yellow intermixed with brown scales tipped with pale greyish yellow and a few pale greyish yellow scales. The hindwings are pale grey.

References

Endemic fauna of Ethiopia
Moths described in 1932
Blastobasis
Insects of Ethiopia
Moths of Africa